Khenifra National Park is a national park in central Morocco, east of the city of the same name. Extending across the middle Atlas Mountains, the park is home to a wealth of fauna and flora. Lake Aguelmame Aziza and Lake Aguelmame Sidi Ali are located within its borders. 

Some of the wildlife that can be found within the park include the rare Barbary macaque, Barbary stag, Barbary sheep, Cuvier's gazelle, Barbary wild boar, and European polecat. The most notable birds located in Khenifra are the Algerian nuthatch, red-knobbed coot, ruddy shelduck, alpine swift, osprey, and golden eagle.

References

National parks of Morocco
Protected areas established in 2008
Geography of Béni Mellal-Khénifra
Geography of Drâa-Tafilalet
Geography of Fès-Meknès